MV Logos Hope is a ship operated as a part of a faith based organisations by Gute Bücher für Alle. She was built in 1973 as the ferry MV Gustav Vasa for service between Malmö (Sweden) and Travemünde (Germany) and later operated as the MV Norröna providing a ferry service to the Faroe Islands.

History
In 1973 the ship was commissioned as the car ferry Gustav Vasa running between Malmö (Sweden) and Travemünde (Germany), a route she ran for 10 years. In April 1983 she was sold to the Faroese ferry company Smyril Line and renamed Norröna. Sailing from Tórshavn, the Faroese capital, to Lerwick (Shetland Islands), Bergen (Norway), Hanstholm (Denmark) and Seyðisfjörður (Iceland) each summer, she was often chartered in the winter to cover other operators’ overhaul schedules. 

On 8 April 1990 the vessel suffered a small deliberate fire in the passenger accommodation resulting in several casualties. The ferry was on charter to B&I Ferries (now Irish Ferries) running between Pembroke Dock & Rosslare. Casualties were evacuated by RAF Rescue Helicopters to Withybush General Hospital in Haverfordwest.

When Smyril Line delivered a new Norröna in 2003, the old vessel became Norröna I and was put up for sale. Gute Bücher für Alle purchased the vessel in March 2004.

References

Ferries of Sweden
Ferries of the Faroe Islands
Ships built in Rendsburg
1973 ships